Anatrachyntis rileyi, the pink cornworm, pink bud moth or pink scavenger, is a species of moth of the family Cosmopterigidae, the cosmet moths. It was first described by Lord Walsingham in 1882 from the southern United States, but it is probably an introduction to North America. It is found in much of the warm or tropical areas of the world, including northern Australia, the Galápagos Islands, Hawaii, the Antilles, South America and Mauritius.

The wingspan is 9 to 12 millimeters. The moth has brown forewings with pale streaks and plain gray hindwings, each edged with a fringe. When at rest, the moth extends its antennae straight out in front of its head. The larva reaches 7 or 8 millimeters in length. It is cylindrical and pink to deep red with a dark brown thorax, a pale brown head, and a black mouth.

The larva feeds on vegetable waste. It has been found in leguminous pods, castor oil seeds, coffee beans, milo grain, old corn silk, cotton bolls, aloe, banana, cherries, eggplant, pineapple fruit and seeds, tamarind, Crassula, and other plants such as torrid panicgrass (Panicum torridum), rain tree (Albizia saman), and Oahu soapberry (Sapindus oahuensis).

The larva pupates for 11 to 13 days in a whitish cocoon amongst its frass. The pupa is 4 to 5 millimeters long, smooth, and light yellowish brown.

References

External links

Anatrachyntis
Insects of Uganda
Moths of Japan
Moths of Africa
Moths of Australia
Moths described in 1882